Koninklijke TNT Post BV was the national postal company in the Netherlands, owned by TNT N.V. Until May 2011, it operated under the brand TNT Post and employed 75,000 people.

History 

In 1989, the state-run enterprise PTT became Royal PTT Netherlands (Koninklijke PTT Nederland: KPN), and the company was incorporated. In 1993, mail offices were privatised, and KPN was listed on the stock exchange in 1994. In 1996, the Australian company TNT Ltd. was obtained through acquisition, and KPN's postal service and TNT merged to form TNT Postal Group (TPG), later renamed TNT N.V.

The national postal service of the Netherlands was called PTT Post until 2002, then TPG Post until October 16, 2006, then finally renamed TNT Post. The old red TPG mailboxes were changed to the new orange TNT mailboxes throughout the country.

In May 2011, due to growing divergence of two major TNT N.V. divisions, mail and express, TNT N.V. changed its name to PostNL after demerging TNT Express. TNT Post was then also rebranded PostNL.

Gallery

Slogan 
"Sure we can" has been TNT Post's slogan since 2010.

See also 
 List of postal codes in the Netherlands
 Postage stamps and postal history of the Netherlands
 PostNL
 TNT N.V.

Notes

External links 
  
 Official website of the new company

Postal system of the Netherlands
Companies based in The Hague
Netherlands